Cortinarius infractiflavus is a species of fungus in the family Cortinariaceae. It was originally described as new to science in 1999 by Meinhard Moser, who named it Cortinarius infractus var. flavus. It was raised to species status in 2014 when molecular analysis showed it to be genetically distinct from C. infractus. The specific epithet infractiflavus refers to its relationship to C. infractus and its yellow cap. The mushroom is known from North American north of Mexico, Finland, and Bulgaria, where it grows on the ground in boreal and mountainous conifer forests.

See also
List of Cortinarius species

References

External links

infractiflavus
Fungi described in 2014
Fungi of Europe
Fungi of North America